The year 1825 was the 44th year of the Rattanakosin Kingdom of Siam (now known as Thailand). It was the first year in the reign of King Rama III.

Incumbents
 Monarch: Rama III
 Front Palace: Sakdiphonlasep
 Supreme Patriarch: Ariyavangsayana (Don)

Events
 July – Negotiations between Siam and the United Kingdom of Great Britain and Ireland begins in Bangkok for what would be known later as the Burney Treaty, named after Henry Burney an agent of the British East India Company.

Births

Deaths

References

 
1820s in Siam
Years of the 19th century in Siam
Siam
Siam